Tithraustes albinigra is a moth of the family Notodontidae. It is endemic to
cloud forest habitats in northern Panama and southern Costa Rica.

It is one of the smallest members of the genus Tithraustes, with a forewing length of 12.5-13.5 mm.

References

Moths described in 1905
Notodontidae of South America